The 1972 Milwaukee Brewers season involved the Brewers' finishing sixth in the American League East with a record of 65 wins and 91 losses. Because of the move of the Washington Senators to Texas, the Brewers shifted from the AL West to the AL East.

Offseason 
 October 10, 1971: Marty Pattin, Lew Krausse Jr., Tommy Harper, and Pat Skrable (minors) were traded by the Brewers to the Boston Red Sox for Jim Lonborg, Ken Brett, Billy Conigliaro, Joe Lahoud, Don Pavletich, and George Scott.
 October 22, 1971: Tom Matchick and Bruce Look were traded by the Brewers to the Baltimore Orioles for Mike Ferraro and Mike Herson (minors).
 November 26, 1971: Eduardo Rodríguez was signed as an amateur free agent by the Brewers.
 January 26, 1972: Andy Kosco was traded by the Brewers to the California Angels for Tommie Reynolds.
 March 31, 1972: Frank Tepedino was purchased from the Brewers by the New York Yankees.

Regular season

Season standings

Record vs. opponents

Notable transactions 
 May 26, 1972: Curt Motton was traded by the Brewers to the California Angels for Archie Reynolds.
 June 6, 1972: Bob Sheldon was drafted by the Brewers in the 22nd round of the 1972 Major League Baseball Draft.
 July 10, 1972: Dick Davis was signed as an amateur free agent by the Brewers.
 July 28, 1972: Ron Clark and Paul Ratliff were traded by the Brewers to the California Angels for Joe Azcue and Syd O'Brien.

Roster

Player stats

Batting

Starters by position 
Note: Pos = Position; G = Games played; AB = At bats; H = Hits; Avg. = Batting average; HR = Home runs; RBI = Runs batted in

Other batters 
Note: Pos = Position; G = Games played; AB = At bats; H = Hits; Avg. = Batting average; HR = Home runs; RBI = Runs batted in

Pitching

Starting pitchers 
Note: G = Games pitched; GS = Games started; IP = Innings pitched; W = Wins; L = Losses; ERA = Earned run average; SO = Strikeouts

Other pitchers 
Note: G = Games pitched; Games started; IP = Innings pitched; W = Wins; L = Losses; ERA = Earned run average; SO = Strikeouts

Relief pitchers 
Note: G = Games pitched; IP = Innings pitched; W = Wins; L = Losses; SV = Saves; ERA = Earned run average; SO = Strikeouts

Farm system

The Brewers' farm system consisted of four minor league affiliates in 1972. The Evansville Triplets won the American Association championship, and the Danville Warriors won the Midwest League championship.

Notes

References 
1972 Milwaukee Brewers team page at Baseball Reference
1972 Milwaukee Brewers team page at www.baseball-almanac.com
1972 Milwaukee Brewers roster page at www.retrosheet.org

Milwaukee Brewers seasons
Milwaukee Brewers season
Milwaukee Brewers